Pachypasa is a genus of moths in the family Lasiocampidae. The genus was erected by Francis Walker in 1855.

Species
Pachypasa otus (Drury, 1773) Italy, Greece, Asia Minor, Iraq, Iran
Pachypasa limosa (de Villiers, 1827) southwestern Europe, northern Africa
Pachypasa denticula (Bethune-Baker, 1908) Zimbabwe
Pachypasa drucei (Bethune-Baker, 1908) Zimbabwe
Pachypasa argibasis (Mabille, 1893) western and eastern Africa
Pachypasa pallens (Bethune-Baker, 1908) Zimbabwe
Pachypasa subfascia Walker, 1855 western Africa
Pachypasa multipunctata (Hering, 1932)

External links

Lasiocampidae